Per Ludvig Magnus (9 April 1945 – 19 June 2015) was a Norwegian diplomat.

He was born in Oslo, and is a cand.jur. by education. He started working for the Norwegian Ministry of Foreign Affairs in 1974, and was the Norwegian ambassador to Saudi Arabia from 1991 to 1992. He served as deputy Under-secretary of State in the Ministry of Foreign Affairs from 1992 to 1996, the Norwegian ambassador to the OECD from 1991 to 2001, assistant to the Permanent Under-Secretary of State in the Ministry of Foreign Affairs from 2001 to 2005 and the Norwegian ambassador to Spain from 2005 to 2010.

References

1945 births
Living people
Diplomats from Oslo
Ambassadors of Norway to Saudi Arabia
Ambassadors of Norway to Spain